Brian Crawford may refer to:

 Brian Crawford (footballer) (born 1978), Scottish football striker
 Brian Crawford (politician) (1926–2004), Australian politician